Buddy Hackett (born Leonard Hacker; August 31, 1924 – June 30, 2003) was an American actor, comedian and singer. His best remembered roles include Marcellus Washburn in The Music Man (1962), Benjy Benjamin in It's a Mad, Mad, Mad, Mad World (1963), Tennessee Steinmetz in The Love Bug (1968), and the voice of Scuttle in The Little Mermaid (1989).

Early life
Hackett was one of two children born into a Jewish family living in Brooklyn, New York. His mother Anna (née Geller) worked in the garment trades while his father Philip Hacker was a furniture upholsterer and part-time inventor. Hackett grew up across from Public School 103 on 54th Street and 14th Avenue in Borough Park, Brooklyn, and was active in varsity football and drama club at New Utrecht High School. Hackett suffered from Bell's palsy as a child, the lingering effects of which contributed to his distinctive slurred speech and facial expression.

While still a student, Hackett worked as a "tummler" (Yiddish for "tumult maker") entertaining guests in the Catskills Borscht Belt resorts. While there, he began performing stand-up comedy in the resort nightclubs as "Butch Hacker". He appeared first at the Golden Hotel in Hurleyville, New York, claiming later he did not get one single laugh. Following his graduation from high school in 1942, Hackett enlisted in the United States Army and served during World War II for three years in an anti-aircraft battery.

Career

Early career
Hackett's first job after the war was at the Pink Elephant, a Brooklyn club. It was here that he changed his name from Leonard Hacker to Buddy Hackett. He made appearances in Los Angeles and Las Vegas, and continued to perform in the Catskills. He acted on Broadway, in Lunatics and Lovers, where Max Liebman saw him and put him in two television specials.

Hackett's movie career began in 1950 with a 10-minute "World of Sports" reel for Columbia Pictures called King of the Pins. The film demonstrated championship bowling techniques, with expert Joe Wilman demonstrating the right way and Hackett (in pantomime) exemplifying the wrong way. There was an anecdote that, because of this appearance, Hackett received an offer to join the Three Stooges from Jules White, the head of Columbia short subject department, in 1952. Curly Howard had suffered a debilitating stroke in 1946; his older brother Shemp Howard was intended to replace him only on a temporary basis until he fully recovered, but Curly died in January 1952. It was said Hackett even joined Moe Howard and Larry Fine for a rehearsal, but turned down the offer eventually when he felt he did not fit with the act's comedy style and wanted to develop his own style as a solo act. This rumor was later dismissed as either untrue or unfounded.

Hackett would not return to movies until 1953, after one of his nightclub routines attracted attention. With a rubber band around his head to slant his eyes, Hackett's "The Chinese Waiter" lampooned the heavy dialect, frustration, and communication problems encountered by a busy waiter in a Chinese restaurant: "No, we no have sprit-pea soup ... We gotta wonton, we got eh-roll ... No orda for her, juss orda for you!" The routine was such a hit that Hackett made a recording of it, and was hired to reprise it in the Universal-International musical Walking My Baby Back Home (1953), in which he was third-billed under Donald O'Connor and Janet Leigh.

Hackett was an emergency replacement for the similarly built Lou Costello in 1954. Abbott and Costello were set to make a feature-length comedy Fireman, Save My Child, featuring Spike Jones and His City Slickers. Several scenes had been shot with stunt doubles when Lou Costello was forced to withdraw due to illness. Universal-International salvaged the project by hiring Hugh O'Brian and Hackett to take over the Abbott and Costello roles with Jones and his band becoming the main attraction.

Hackett became known to a wider audience when he appeared on television in the 1950s and '60s as a frequent guest on variety talk shows hosted by Jack Paar and Arthur Godfrey, telling brash, often off-color jokes, and mugging at the camera. Hackett was a frequent guest on both the Jack Paar and the Johnny Carson versions of The Tonight Show. According to the board game Trivial Pursuit, Hackett has the distinction of making the most guest appearances in the history of The Tonight Show Starring Johnny Carson. During this time, he also appeared as a panelist and mystery guest on CBS-TV's What's My Line? and filled in as emcee for the game show Treasure Hunt. He made fifteen guest appearances on NBC-TV's The Perry Como Show between 1955 and 1961. He appeared with his roommate Lenny Bruce on the Patrice Munsel Show (1957-1958), calling their comedy duo the "Not Ready for Prime Time Players," 20 years before the cast of Saturday Night Live used the same name.

Hackett appeared twice on ABC's The Rifleman, starring Chuck Connors and Johnny Crawford. In both episodes, "Bloodlines" (1959) and "The Clarence Bibs Story" (1961), his fellow guest star was Denver Pyle. He was cast as Daniel Malakie in "Bloodlines", the father of three boisterous brothers headed to trouble, and then as Clarence Bibs in the episode of that same name. Bibs is a handyman who after cleaning a gun accidentally kills a notorious outlaw, Longden (X Brands). Then, Longden's former partner, George Tanner (Denver Pyle), comes to town but avoids confrontation with Bibs and accepts the explanation that Wicks' death was accidental.

Stanley
Hackett starred as the title character on NBC-TV's Stanley, a 1956–57 situation comedy which ran for 19 weeks on Monday evenings at 8:30 pm ET. The half-hour series also featured a young Carol Burnett and the voice of Paul Lynde. The Max Liebman produced program aired live before a studio audience and was one of the last sitcoms from New York to do so. Stanley revolved around the adventures of the titular character (Hackett) as the operator of a newsstand in a posh New York City hotel.

Hackett appeared opposite Robert Preston in the film adaptation of The Music Man (1962). In It's a Mad, Mad, Mad, Mad World (1963), Hackett was paired with Mickey Rooney, with whom he had also recently made Everything's Ducky (1961), in which they played two sailors who smuggle a talking duck aboard a Navy ship. Children became familiar with him as lovable hippie auto mechanic Tennessee Steinmetz in Disney's The Love Bug (1968).

In 1964, he had a stint on Broadway, appearing with Richard Kiley in I Had a Ball.

He appeared many times on the game show Hollywood Squares in the late 1960s and 1970s. In one episode, Hackett (who was Jewish) was asked which country had the highest ratio of doctors to populace; he answered Israel, or in his words, "The country with the most Jews." Despite the audience roaring with laughter (and Hackett's own belief that the actual answer was Sweden), the answer turned out to be correct. Hackett's regular guest shots on Jack Paar's Tonight Show in the early 1960s were rewarded with a coveted appearance on Paar's final Tonight program on March 29, 1962.

Later career
Hackett continued to appear on Johnny Carson's Tonight Show until Carson left the series in 1992.

In 1974 Hackett published a book of poetry entitled The Naked Mind of Buddy Hackett.

In 1978, Hackett delivered a dramatic performance as Lou Costello in the television movie Bud and Lou opposite Harvey Korman as Bud Abbott. The film told the story of Abbott and Costello, and he and Korman did a rendition of the team's famous "Who's on First?" routine.

In 1979, Hackett was the voice of the groundhog "Pardon Me Pete", and the narrator of the Rankin/Bass Christmas special Jack Frost (1979). He starred in the 1980 film Hey Babe!. That same year, he hosted a syndicated revival of the 1950–61 Groucho Marx quiz show You Bet Your Life which lasted for one year.

Hackett appeared regularly in TV ads for Tuscan Dairy popsicles and yogurt throughout the 1970s, but his most famous television campaign was for Lay's potato chips ("Nobody can eat just one!") which ran from 1968 to 1971; Hackett had succeeded Bert Lahr as Lay's spokesman. He guest-starred in the Space Rangers episode, "To Be Or Not To Be", as has-been comedian Lenny Hacker, a parody of his stage persona. The character's name was Hackett's own real name. He also appeared on the television series The Love Boat in 1979 (Season 3, Episode 3), playing the part of a cab driver, Mickey, who accepted an offer to join his jilted passenger (Arlene Golonka) on a three-day cruise. In 1987, Hackett appeared on Murder, She Wrote (Season 3, Episode 18). He also appeared in LA Law as a friend of Secretary Roxanne helping her by doing free TV infomercials.

Other
For his contribution to the motion picture industry, Hackett was given a star on the Hollywood Walk of Fame. In 2000, a Golden Palm Star on the Palm Springs, California, Walk of Stars was dedicated to him.

In April 1998, Hackett guest starred in an episode of LateLine called "Buddy Hackett". The episode focused on a news broadcast paying tribute to Hackett following his death, only to discover that the report of his death was a mistake. Robert Reich and Dick Gephardt also appeared in the episode, paying tribute to Hackett, by singing along to Hackett's rendition of Shipoopi from The Music Man.

In his final years, Hackett had a recurring spot called "Tuesdays with Buddy" on The Late Late Show with Craig Kilborn in which he shared stories of his career and delivered some of his comedic routines.

In 1999 he appeared in 13 episodes of Fox's Action TV series as a security guard and chauffeur named Lonnie Dragon.

In 2021, Hackett was inducted into the New Jersey Hall of Fame.

Personal life
On June 12, 1955, Hackett married Sherry Cohen. They lived in Leonia, New Jersey, in the late 1950s. In August 1958, they bought the house previously owned by deceased crime boss Albert Anastasia in Fort Lee, New Jersey. After renovations, they moved in and lived there through most of the 1960s. In 2003, Hackett and his wife established the Singita Animal Sanctuary in California's San Fernando Valley.
Hackett's son, Sandy, followed his father into the comedy world, and for years opened for his father before his performances. Sandy created a one-man stage show about his father after his death.

He was an avid firearms collector and owned a large collection that he sold off in his later years.

Death
In the early 1990s, Hackett was diagnosed with severe heart disease, but steadfastly refused to consider bypass surgery. His heart disease was the primary cause of his death on June 30, 2003, at his beach house in Malibu, California, at the age of 78. His son, comedian Sandy Hackett, said his father had been suffering from diabetes for several years and suffered a stroke nearly a week before his death, which may have contributed to his demise. Two days later, on July 2, 2003, he was cremated and his ashes were given to family and friends.

Discography
 How You Do (Coral CRL 757422)
 The Original Chinese Waiter (Dot 3351, reissued as Pickwick SPC 3198)
 Ba-Lert

Filmography

Features

Short subjects

References

External links
 Disney Legends profile
 The final days: Buddy Hackett's last interview
 
 
 
 Premiere: Hecta Sample Buddy Hackett for Their Eerie Dance Track, "The Concept"

1924 births
2003 deaths
Jewish American military personnel
Jewish American male comedians
United States Army personnel of World War II
American stand-up comedians
American male film actors
American male television actors
American male voice actors
Deaths from diabetes
Male actors from New York City
Military personnel from New York City
Donaldson Award winners
Jewish American male actors
Jewish male comedians
People from Borough Park, Brooklyn
People from Fort Lee, New Jersey
People from Leonia, New Jersey
20th-century American male actors
Comedians from New York City
20th-century American comedians
21st-century American comedians
New Utrecht High School alumni
United States Army soldiers
20th-century American Jews
21st-century American Jews